Timothy Walter Bardsley is a Canadian lawyer and politician.  He graduated from the University of Toronto in 1976 with a B.A with honours.  He studied law at Dalhousie University and graduated from there in 1979. One year later he moved to Calgary, Alberta, and in 1983 he was elected to city council in Ward 7, where he served for six years while continuing to work as a lawyer. In 1989 he ran unsuccessfully for the Alberta legislature as a Liberal candidate in the electoral district of Calgary-Bow.  He worked for Brownlee LLP in Calgary until 2007, and later for Fraser Milner Casgrain LLP in Calgary and thereafter Dentons.

See also 
https://web.archive.org/web/20070927221722/http://www.calgary.ca/DocGallery/BU/cityclerks/caldermen.pdf -Calgary Politicians

https://web.archive.org/web/20070930141656/http://www.brownleelaw.com/lawyers/lawyer.php?s=ad&city=Calgary&l_id=104 -Bardsley's profile at Brownlee

http://www.dentons.com/en/tim-bardsley -Bardsley's profile at Dentons

20th-century Canadian lawyers
Calgary city councillors
University of Toronto alumni
Schulich School of Law alumni
Living people
21st-century Canadian lawyers
Year of birth missing (living people)